Semaphorin-3C is a protein that in humans is encoded by the SEMA3C gene.

References

Further reading